Nosik is a gender-neutral Russian surname.  The word "носик" literally means "little nose" in Russian.  Notable people with this surname include:
Anton Nosik,  Russian journalist, social activist and blogger.
Valery Nosik (1940–1995), Russian film and stage actor,
Vladimir Nosik (born 1948), Russian actor

Russian-language surnames